Lady Eva Julius OBE (1878 – 5 July 1972) was an Australian Girl Guide Commissioner and child welfare worker. She was a recipient of the Silver Fish Award, Girl Guiding's highest adult award.

Early life and family 
Eva Drongsia Odierna O'Connor was born in Hokitika, New Zealand, to Susan Laetitia and Charles Yelverton O'Connor. She was one of seven siblings, including Bridget Yelverton Lee Steere. The family moved to Western Australia in 1891. She married the inventor George Alfred Julius on 7 December 1898. They had three sons. George was knighted in 1929, at which point Eva became Lady Julius.

Julius was an ardent gardener.
Her garden featured a scenic model railway, built during their children's adolescence; it was called "one of the mechanical wonders of the world" and featured waterways, functioning cranes and lighting. They held many garden fetes featuring the railway, with Lady Julius' charities often the beneficiaries.

Julius was "well versed in science, art and literature". A 1936 profile in The Sun, in a series "Leaders of Women", described her as "one of the most feminine of our feminists, this latter word being used in its most flattering sense."

After Sir George died in 1945 she moved into a modest flat in Killara, Sydney.
She died on 5 July 1972 and was privately cremated.

Girl Guides
Julius was associated with Girl Guiding in New South Wales for many years. She called it "the most important youth movement in the world."

She was a member of the Executive of the Australian Girl Guides Association for many years becoming State Commissioner of New South Wales from 1939 to 1949. When she stepped down from the role she was elected vice-president of the Association, a position she held until at least 1955. She received the Silver Fish Award, Girl Guiding's highest adult honour, presented by HRH the Duchess of Gloucester in 1946. She began working at the New South Wales Girl Guide Gift Shop in 1948, becoming its patron in 1960.

Child welfare

Kindergartens and day nurseries
Julius was "actively interested in kindergartens, day nurseries and the Crippled Children's Society."
She began working at Newtown Free Kindergarten, one of Australia's first kindergartens, in 1915 "as I had finished my own personal kindergarten at home."
By 1930, she was president of the organisation.

She was involved in a successful 'adoption' scheme, where any member of the public could ‘adopt’ a child's early education, by covering their kindergarten fees of £6 a year.

In 1935 she organised an "old English fair" which raised enough money to wipe out the debts of the 16 free kindergartens that comprised the Kindergarten Union. The following year she was elected president of the Kindergarten Union. remaining a member until at least 1949.

In 1936 her aim was to achieve "co-operation between the day nurseries and kindergartens" such that children who had outgrown nursery could begin to receive 'training' rather than simply having their basic needs of food, hygiene and amusement met.

Disabled children's welfare 
Julius was heavily involved in the welfare of disabled children. She was:

 on the board of the Darling Point-Woollahra branch of the Crippled Children's Society 
 on the executive committee of the Citizens' Crippled Children Service Campaign 
 on the executive committee of the Rotary Club's Crippled Children's Service Fund
 president of Crippled Children’s Silver Bridge Appeal
 on the board of the New South Wales Society for Crippled Children
 vice-president of the Women's Council of the New South Wales Society for Crippled Children

Other community work
 1930s – Member, Sydney Symphony Orchestra
 1931 – Patron, New Zealand Association
 1934 – President, Ladies' Committee for the International Concert in Aid of the Benevolent Society in Sydney
 1935 – Patron, Hopewood House Musicales
 1936 – President, RSPCA Ball
 1937 – Member, East Sydney Technical College Advisory Council
 1940–45 – Hon. Organiser of the Comforts Depot (Lord Mayor's Patriotic War Fund of New South Wales) and Hon. Advisor in 1945
 1941–42 – Chair, Women’s Committee of the Lord Mayor’s Patriotic War Fund
 1942 – Winner of the YWCA National Shilling Drive Popular Grandmother Competition, receiving 37,482 votes
 1949 – Vice-president, Lady Gowrie Model Centre

References

1878 births
1972 deaths
Recipients of the Silver Fish Award
Officers of the Order of the British Empire
Girl Guiding and Girl Scouting
Girlguiding
Girlguiding officials
Scouting and Guiding in Australia
Eva